Guy Boucher (1943 – 20 March 2012) was a French Canadian actor, singer and radio and TV presenter.

He was best known as co-presenter of the TV show Les coqueluches with Gaston L'Heureux from 1974 to 1978, mid-days at the Complexe Desjardins, Montréal.

References

1943 births
2012 deaths
20th-century Canadian male singers